Istanbul Cup may refer to:
İstanbul Cup, a WTA tennis tournament
Istanbul Cup (figure skating), a figure skating competition
Istanbul Football Cup, a football competition